The Prague Hotel is located at 1402 South 13th Street on the southwest corner of South 13th and William Streets in the heart of the Little Bohemia neighborhood of Omaha, Nebraska. Designed by Joseph Guth and built in 1898, this building was listed on the National Register of Historic Places in 1987.

History
In 1869, Vaclav Stepanek built the first Czech dance hall where Prague Hotel now stands. Gottlieb Storz built the Prague Hotel in 1898, as a three-story brick building that provided Nebraska's Czech immigrants with familiarities in their new country.  It opened on June 1, 1898.   In addition to a 25-room hotel, it included a restaurant and a tavern.   A sign in the tavern window proclaimed in Czech, "Pražská Pivnice, Dámy Jsou Vítány", which translated to English meant "Prague Hotel, Ladies Are Invited".   The tavern closed in 1942.   For more than forty years it had remained the only hotel catering to Bohemians between Chicago and the Pacific Coast.

In 1987 the building was rehabilitated and converted into apartments. Local architectural firm Prochaska & Associates won awards for their renovation work on the building.

See also
History of Omaha, Nebraska
Bohemian Cafe

References

Hotel buildings completed in 1898
Czech-American history
National Register of Historic Places in Omaha, Nebraska
History of South Omaha, Nebraska
Apartment buildings in Omaha, Nebraska
Defunct hotels in Omaha, Nebraska
Landmarks in South Omaha, Nebraska
Czech-American culture in Omaha, Nebraska
Hotel buildings on the National Register of Historic Places in Nebraska
Joseph P. Guth buildings
1898 establishments in Nebraska